Animal Free Research UK (AFRUK), formerly the Dr Hadwen Trust, is a UK medical research charity that funds and promotes non-animal techniques to replace animal experiments. Established in 1970, the work undertaken by Animal Free Research UK develops reliable science whilst avoiding animal testing.

Originally registered with the Charity Commission as charity number 261096, as the Dr Hadwen Trust, the charity became incorporated as a charitable company (registered charity number 1146896) in 2013. In 2015, the Dr Hadwen Trust became registered as a charity in Scotland (SC045327). In April 2017, the charity changed its working name from Dr Hadwen Trust to become Animal Free Research UK.

Animal Free Research UK promotes the practice of non-animal research through its funding, publications, science community outreach, and the media.

Research 
Projects receiving funding from the Dr. Hadwen Trust range from epilepsy, multiple sclerosis, breast and skin cancer, meningitis, asthma, diabetes and drug testing, to arthritis, Parkinson’s disease, lung injury, whooping cough, vaccine testing, dentistry, heart disease, tropical illness, fetal development, brain tumours, and AIDS.

Funding is received in the form of summer studentships, PhD students, post-docs, and strategic grants.

See also 

List of animal rights groups
 The Three Rs
 Cellular model
 Computational biology
 Computational biomodeling
 Computer experiment
 Folding@home
 In silico
 In vitro
 Animal in vitro cellular and developmental biology
 Plant in vitro cellular and developmental biology
 In vitro toxicology
 In vitro to in vivo extrapolation
 Nonclinical studies
 Virtual screening
 Animals (Scientific Procedures) Act (1986)
 Directive 2010/63/EU
 Walter Hadwen

References

External links 
 
 

Animal testing
Animal charities based in the United Kingdom
Animal welfare organisations based in the United Kingdom
Anti-vivisection organizations
Health charities in the United Kingdom
Organizations established in 1970
1970 establishments in the United Kingdom